Elections to Suffolk County Council as part of the 1993 United Kingdom local elections were held on 6 May 1993. 80 councillors were elected from various electoral divisions, which returned one county councillor each by first-past-the-post voting for a four-year term of office.

Summary

Division results

Babergh

District summary

Division results

Forest Heath

District summary

Division results

Ipswich

District summary

Division results

Mid Suffolk

District summary

Division results

Suffolk Coastal

District summary

Division results

St. Edmundsbury

District summary

Division results

Waveney

District summary

Division results

References

1993 English local elections
1993